This was the first edition of the tournament.

Camilo Ugo Carabelli won the title after defeating Nino Serdarušić 6–4, 6–2 in the final.

Seeds

Draw

Finals

Top half

Bottom half

References

External links
Main draw
Qualifying draw

BNP Paribas Polish Cup - 1